FK Rad is a professional football club based in Banjica, Belgrade, Serbia. They compete in the Serbian First League, the second tier of the national league system.

Founded in 1958, the club spent a total of 30 seasons in the top flight between 1987 and 2021, including five seasons in the Yugoslav First League, 12 seasons in the First League of Serbia and Montenegro, and 13 seasons in the Serbian SuperLiga.

History
The club was founded on 10 March 1958 by GP Rad, a local construction company. They acquired the league rights from FK Razvitak, a small club based in Banjica, going on to compete in the local leagues of Belgrade until the early 1970s. The club earned promotion to the Yugoslav Second League in 1973, spending the next 14 seasons in the second tier of Yugoslav football. They also reached the 1981–82 Yugoslav Cup quarter-finals, losing to Dinamo Zagreb.

In the 1986–87 Yugoslav Second League, the club became champions in Group East and took promotion to the Yugoslav First League for the first time in history. They placed 15th in their debut appearance in the top flight, just one point above the relegation zone. The club subsequently finished in fourth place in the 1988–89 season, earning a spot in the 1989–90 UEFA Cup. They were eliminated in the first round after losing 3–2 on aggregate to Olympiacos.

Following the breakup of Yugoslavia, the club continued to compete in the top flight, placing fifth in the 1992–93 First League of FR Yugoslavia. They would also place in the top five in three consecutive seasons from 1998 to 2000. With the beginning of the new millennium, the club slowly started to decline and eventually suffered relegation in the 2002–03 season. They returned to the top flight of Serbia and Montenegro football in its final edition, but were promptly relegated.

After spending two seasons in the Serbian First League, the club placed fourth in 2007–08, managing to earn promotion to the Serbian SuperLiga via playoffs. They finished fourth in 2010–11, which meant qualification for the 2011–12 UEFA Europa League and a return to European football after 22 years. After spending 13 consecutive seasons in the top flight, the club suffered relegation in 2021.

Honours
Yugoslav Second League (Tier 2)
 1986–87 (Group East)

Seasons

European record

Supporters
The club's main supporters' group, known as United Force, was formed in 1987. They have often been associated with hooliganism and Neo-Nazism due to their long history of incidents. Rad supporters have rivalries with several clubs, including local rivalries with OFK Beograd and Voždovac, and national rivalries with Novi Pazar.

Players

First-team squad

Notable players
This is a list of players who have played at full international level.

  Petar Jelić
  Aleksandar Kosorić
  Nenad Mišković
  Milan Borjan
  Li Chunyu
  Ivan Cvjetković
  Siniša Gogić
  Nikola Drinčić
  Uroš Đurđević
  Vladimir Gluščević
  Filip Kasalica
  Mitar Novaković
  Vladimir Rodić
  Nikola Vujnović
  Dejvi Glavevski
  Aleksandar Lazevski
  Perica Stančeski
  Goran Stanić
  Ostoja Stjepanović
  Aleksandar Todorovski
  Veljko Birmančević
  Miloš Bogunović
  Aleksandar Busnić
  Jovan Damjanović
  Filip Đorđević
  Igor Đurić
  Brana Ilić
  Bojan Isailović
  Bojan Jorgačević
  Aleksandar Jovanović
  Branislav Jovanović
  Damir Kahriman
  Andrija Kaluđerović
  Filip Kljajić
  Nenad Lukić
  Nikola Maraš
  Luka Milivojević
  Bogdan Mladenović
  Pavle Ninkov
  Ognjen Ožegović
  Andrija Pavlović
  Nemanja Pejčinović
  Miloš Stanojević
  Nikola Stojiljković
  Nenad Tomović
  Slobodan Urošević
  Vladimir Volkov
  Jagoš Vuković
  Nenad Brnović
  Goran Bunjevčević
  Željko Cicović
  Petar Divić
  Boban Dmitrović
  Ljubinko Drulović
  Nenad Grozdić
  Spira Grujić
  Zoran Mirković
  Predrag Ocokoljić
  Aleksandar Pantić
  Marko Perović
  Dejan Rađenović
  Vuk Rašović
  Predrag Ristović
  Borislav Stevanović
  Miroslav Stević
  Dragan Vukmir
  Aleksandar Živković
  Miroslav Đukić
  Jusuf Hatunić
  Vladimir Jugović
  Mihailo Petrović
  Vladan Radača
  Vlada Stošić
  Ilija Zavišić

For a list of all FK Rad players with a Wikipedia article, see :Category:FK Rad players.

Managerial history

References

External links
 
 Club page at Srbijasport

 
1958 establishments in Serbia
Association football clubs established in 1958
Football clubs in Belgrade
Football clubs in Serbia
Football clubs in Yugoslavia